Smrity Sinha is an Indian actress. Sinha was born on 4 September 1989 in the Dumka district of Jharkhand into a Sinha family. Smrity mainly works in Bollywood & Bhojpuri films and television serials. She made her on-screen debut with Rangila Babu (2008) and her Bhojpuri television debut was Jai Maa Vaishno Devi.

Filmography

Television

Awards and nominations

See also
 List of Bhojpuri cinema actresses

References

External links

1989 births
Living people
Indian film actresses
21st-century Indian actresses
Actresses from Lucknow
Indian television actresses
Actresses in Bhojpuri cinema